Leonard Moore Taylor (born February 15, 1961) is a former wide receiver in the National Football League (NFL) and the Arena Football League (AFL).

Biography
Taylor was born Leonard Moore Taylor on February 15, 1961, in Miami, Florida.

Career

Green Bay Packers
Taylor was drafted by the Green Bay Packers in the twelfth round of the 1984 NFL Draft and played with the team that season.

Washington Commandos
After sitting out for two seasons, Taylor played for the Washington Commandos of the Arena Football League.

Atlanta Falcons
After two seasons away from the NFL, he played with the Atlanta Falcons during the 1987 NFL season as a scab during the 1987 NFL strike.

Detroit Drive
Taylor joined the Detroit Drive in 1988, helping the team win ArenaBowl II.

He played at the collegiate level at the University of Tennessee.

See also
List of Green Bay Packers players

References

Players of American football from Miami
Green Bay Packers players
Atlanta Falcons players
American football wide receivers
Tennessee Volunteers football players
Living people
Washington Commandos players
Detroit Drive players
1961 births
National Football League replacement players